6-Chloro-MDMA (6-Cl-MDMA, 2-Cl-4,5-MDMA) is a derivative of the amphetamine drug MDMA, which has been identified both in seized "ecstasy" tablets and in urine samples from drug users. It is thought most likely to be an impurity from synthesis and its pharmacological properties have not been established, however it has been banned in several countries.

Legal status
6-Chloro-MDMA is illegal in the UK, Germany (Anlage I) and China.

See also 
 6-Bromo-MDA

References 

Chloroarenes
Substituted amphetamines